European Business Awards for the Environment are awarded by the European Union to recognise companies that combine competitiveness with respect for the environment.

The awards take into consideration voluntary schemes such as EMAS and Ecolabel, together with other comparable projects, which demonstrate commitment to develop and apply sustainable management practices. The awards were originally established in 1987 as the European Better Environment Awards for Industry, renamed in 2000 as the European Awards for the Environment, and renamed again in 2004 as the current European Business Awards for the Environment.

The award is presented in five categories: Management, Product and services, Process innovation, International business cooperation and Business and biodiversity.

Recent Winners
Source: European Commission

Management Award
2018/19 A&B Laboratorios de Biotecnología S.A.U (Spain), for Integration of the Sustainable Development Goals in their strategy for a sustainable and competitive growth
2016/17 (Large Company) CMS Window Systems (UK), for CMS Innovation Hub 
2014/15 Eczacıbaşı Yapı Gereçleri (VitrA) (Turkey), for Blue Life Integrated Sustainability Management System
2012 Marks & Spencer (UK), for Marks & Spencer Plan A - Doing the Right Thing
2010 Findus Group (UK), for Fish for Life: Supporting Sustainable Fisheries
2008 The Co-operative Group Ltd (UK), for The Co-operative Group’s Approach to Sustainable Development

The Product and Services Award
2018/19 AFULudine (France), for An environmentally-neutral lubricant
2016/17 Hydromx International A.S. (Turkey), for Energy Efficient Heat Transfer Fluid for Heating and Cooling
2014/15 EcoNation (Belgium), for Lighten the Energy Bill
2012 Aquamarine Power (UK), for Aquamarine Power's Oyster wave energy technology
2010 EnergyICT (Belgium), for Implementation of the Advanced Energy Management System, EIServer, at the British Retailer TESCO 
2008 Ertex-Solar GmbH (Austria), for Ertex-Solar – photovoltaic modules in laminated safety glass technology

The Process Innovation Award
2018/19 DSM-Niaga (Netherlands), for Redesign product from scratch for the circular economy, using only recyclable materials and a reversible glue
2016/17  (France), for Pheromonal mating disruption through paintball against the pine processionary moth
2014/15 Daimler AG (Germany), for  Reduction and Lightweight Construction for Combustion Engines 
2012 Umicore (Belgium), for Recycling of NiMH and Li-ion batteries: a sustainable new business
2010 Zenergy Power GmbH and Bültmann GmbH (Germany), for Cutting energy consumption by 50% using magnetic billet heating based on superconductor technology
2008 CHOREN GmbH (Germany), for Sustainable production of synthetic biofuel (BTL) using the Carbo-V process

The International Business Cooperation Award
2018/19 EOSTA B.V. (Netherlands), for  the "True Cost of Food” campaign which calculates and communicates the hidden costs of the food system
2016/17 Fairphone BV (Netherlands), for ethical electronics
2014/15  Interface Nederland BV (Netherlands), for Net-Works
2012 INENSUS GmbH (Germany), for MicroPowerEconomy – a Private Public Partnership model for comprehensive island-grid village electrification with renewable energy
2010 Ferrovial (Spain), for ‘Maji ni Uhai’ (Water is life). Water supply and sanitation in Serengueti District, Tanzania
2008 KIT (Royal Tropical Institute) Holding/Mali BioCarburant SA (Netherlands), for   Sustainable Biodiesel Production in Mali

The Business and Biodiversity Award
2018/19 Suez Spain (Spain), for From water treatment plants to Biodiversity Reserves
2016/17 HiPP-Werk Georg Hipp OHG (Germany), for 20 Years of HiPP Sustainability Management
2014/15 Red Eléctrica de España, S.A.U. (Spain), for Birds and Electricity Transmission Lines: Mapping of Flight Paths
2012 Slovenské elektrárne, a.s. (Slovakia), for Energy for Nature: Saving most precious animal species in the Slovak mountains

See also

 List of business awards
 List of environmental awards

References

Environmental awards
Awards established in 1987
Energy and the environment
European awards